Pickin' on Led Zeppelin, Vol. 1–2 is a 2003 two-volume tribute album to Led Zeppelin consisting of twenty-one of their songs replayed in a bluegrass style, as well as an original composition by David West entitled "Jed Zeppelin". It is a part of the Pickin' On… series.

Track listing

Disc one

 "D'yer Mak'er" (Bonham/Jones/Page/Plant) - 3:55
 "Kashmir" (Bonham/Page/Plant) - 5:08
 "Ramble On" (Page/Plant) - 3:33
 "Black Dog" (Jones/Page/Plant) - 3:30
 "Babe I'm Gonna Leave You" (Brendon/Page/Plant) - 3:51
 "Going to California" (Page/Plant) - 3:42
 "No Quarter" (Jones/Page/Plant) - 6:10
 "The Song Remains the Same" (Page/Plant) - 3:42
 "All My Love" (Baldwin/Plant) - 5:03
 "The Battle of Evermore" (Page/Plant) - 4:32
 "Rock and Roll" (Bonham/Jones/Page/Plant) - 3:39
 "Stairway to Heaven" (Page/Plant) - 5:21

Disc two

 "Gallows Pole" (Page/Plant) - 4:38
 "Misty Mountain Hop" (Bonham/Page/Plant) - 5:01
 "Whole Lotta Love" (Bonham/Jones/Page/Plant) - 4:52
 "Your Time Is Gonna Come" (Jones/Page/Plant) - 4:40
 "Over the Hills and Far Away" (Page/Plant) - 4:52
 "Nobody's Fault But Mine" (Page/Plant) - 5:02
 "Trampled Under Foot" (Bonham/Jones/Page/Plant) - 5:09
 "Bron-Y-Aur Stomp" (Jones/Page/Plant) - 4:39
 "Black Mountain Side" (Page) - 3:38
 "Jed Zeppelin" (West) - 3:31

 David West – Producer, Engineer
 Recorded at – Studio "Z", Santa Barbara, California

Led Zeppelin tribute albums
2003 compilation albums
Led Zeppelin